The 1987 Copa Libertadores de América Finals was the final two-legged tie to determine the 1987 Copa Libertadores champion. It was contested by Uruguayan club Peñarol and Colombian club América de Cali. The first leg of the tie was played on 21 October at Estadio Olímpico Pascual Guerrero of Cali, while the second leg was played on 28 October at Estadio Centenario in Montevideo.

With both teams having won one game each, a playoff match had to be played at Estadio Nacional in Santiago, Chile. Peñarol became champions there after beating América 1–0 at the end of extra time, winning their fifth Copa Libertadores. As America would have been crowned champions with a tie because of goal difference, Diego Aguirre’s last-minute goal goal for Peñarol at minute 120 of extra time is considered one of the most emblematic moments in the history of the competition.

Format
The finals was played over two legs; home and away. The team that accumulated the most points —two for a win, one for a draw, zero for a loss— after the two legs was crowned champion. If the two teams were tied on points after the second leg, a playoff in a neutral would become the next tie-breaker. Goal difference was used as a last resort.

Qualified teams

Venues

Match details

First leg

Second leg

Play-off

References

1987 in South American football
Copa Libertadores Finals
Peñarol matches
América de Cali matches
Football in Uruguay
Football in Colombia